Alberto Greco (January 15 1931 – October 12 1965) was an Argentine artist who was instrumental in the development of conceptual art in Argentina, Brazil, and Spain. His best known artwork is a series called Vivo Dito in which Greco draws attention to objects and people as living art pieces within everyday life.

Biography 
Alberto Greco was born in Buenos Aires, Argentina in 1931. He was part of a family of five; his older brother, Jorge Julio, was eight years his senior, and his brother Edgardo was younger than him by four years. His mother was Ana Victoria Disolina Ferraris and his father was Francisco José. Greco never married and neither did he leave traces of a significant other in his life despite having friends. This gave him the freedom to do what he wanted without the burden of a partner, allowing him to travel freely. Alberto Greco was a student of Tomás Maldonado and attended many workshops put on by Cecilia Marcouch. Greco also attended the School of Fine Arts but dropped out. Throughout his time as an artist, he also worked and lived with many different artists. Greco not only influenced others but was also influenced by other artists.

Career 
Alberto Greco not only considered himself the greatest informalist of his time, but acted as if he was. Informalism branched off from expressionism. Informal art explored possibilities of gestures and materialism that was typically non-traditional, and signage as the basis of communication. Informalism is creating artwork or signs, then giving them meaning afterwards. This focused on giving the viewer the freedom to think for themselves and decide what they see.

Greco only desired a handful of things, such as validation, glory, and fame, and tried getting them through a variety of ways. Due to his eagerness to be famous and his rebellious ways, Greco would often get himself invited into places to later on not show up. Soon after this period, Greco's name began to be associated with the idea of scandal and imposture. To this Greco responded, "I am so serious a painter that I have no need to assume the appearance of one." Alberto Greco was obsessed with the idea of growth and, through that, he believed that the "will to grow was the will to erase prejudice". Because of Greco's response to people's words and his ways of excluding prejudice, he became a symbol of the liberating angel to the marginalized. This is one of the reasons many consider him a leader. Instead of supporting public criticism, often artists would defend his work and his name.

Alberto Greco created an outstanding amount of manifestos and these are just a few of them. Greco created many different manifestos during his Vito Dito series such as his "Gran Manifiesto-Rollo Arte Vito Dito". Alberto Greco created a manifesto titled "Grand vito-dito Anti Manifiesto".

Vito Dito

Origins of Vito Dito and personal life
Alberto Greco had an interesting relationship with himself. He often was overwhelmed by his being and through this aspired to break away from his identity. Greco would often beat himself up over the idea of becoming famous and pushed himself to exceed his own expectations. Simultaneously, he would glorify himself by hanging posters around cities he frequented, which said things like "Greco how great you are" and "Greco, America's greatest informalist painter." He often tied himself up with the idea of hope and corruption. Hope, for it gave him the will to be rebellious, and corruption because it nourished the idea of rebellion. Despite this, Greco would put himself above the general codes of morality and considered himself a moralist. Like an unbalanced scale, he would often go from smoking cigarettes on the street to being waited on by maids in odd environments such as parks or gardens. Greco was also fascinated with quotidian reality; this is the idea of belonging to each day. With this fascination, Greco began to create the Vito Dito project.

Vito Dito project
Vito Dito means "living finger." This was a series Greco created in 1962 to emphasize the idea of living in the now. For this project, Greco would walk around a town and sign objects, people, or animals. Greco once wrote a manifesto on a scroll and strung it around the town, calling it "Gran Manifiesto- Rollo Arte Vito Dito". He would also draw circles on the ground and sign his name outside the circle. It is believed that Greco once drew a circle around a man and would not let him out of it. He left the art in its place because he believed "once that object is found, it lives in its place, it does not transform it or carry it off to an art gallery."

Vito Dito was not a trend but instead a living piece of Greco. The point of this was to redefine art because he lived as a rebel against all formalizing and institutionalizing tendencies of art. Greco believed that art is an act of discovery and a process of looking. Through this project, he aimed to teach people to see the beauty of everyday objects. Greco created this series because he believed that people should not create art and then go back and re-decorate it. Greco often compared a finished project to a dead object; when something dies you do not go to its grave and dig it up to change its appearance or add to it, you simply let it rest, as you should to your artwork. Greco often wrote "live art seeks its object"; this is the reason he went out and pursued objects to sign because art is all around us. This allowed Greco to create a canvas anywhere and everywhere instead of limiting the idea of canvas to something that could have a measurement.

Greco created many different paintings during his Vito Dito series such as these.

Exhibitions and Artworks

First Live Art Exhibit
One of Greco's first exhibits that showed live art was in Paris in 1962. This exhibition belonged to Pablo Curatella Manes and Germein Derbecq and showcased other artists as well as Greco. His piece was called "30 Mice From Neo-Figuration". This artwork included 30 mice inside a glass box, in which the insides were painted black. Greco's piece was taken out of the exhibition because the mice began to reek. After being kicked out, Greco took the mice to a hotel and fed them bread; he later debated showing the eaten pieces of bread as his artwork. Not too long afterward, Greco was kicked out of the hotel because of the smell of the mice.

Sin Titulo Series
Greco not only created art such as the Vito Dito series, but had many different forms he involved himself in. Some of his art had political influences, such as his piece about President Kennedy's assassination during Greco's "Sin Titulo Series". "Sin Titulo" translates to "without a title" from Spanish. For examples, follow these links: Sin Titulo, Sin Titulo, Sin Titulo, Sin Titulo, Sin Titulo, Sin Titulo.

Other Artworks
Here are some of the many different paintings Greco created during his time.
 
Greco also had the opportunity to present some of his artwork before the President of Italy in 1963. He here performed a political piece that included rats and was titled "Christ 63". This, however, did not go the right way because Greco ended up being kicked out of Italy because he released rats in front of the President.

Other forms of art
Greco also immersed himself in different forms of art and created poetry as well as jewellery. He published his first poetry book in 1950.

Death
Alberto Greco committed suicide on October 14, 1965, a few months after his 35th birthday. Greco planned his death in the early months of 1965, deciding that his suicide would be his last piece as a means of social commentary and an art performance. Grecos cause of death was an overdose of barbiturates. Barbiturates are a type of antidepressant prescribed for sleeping disorders. This type of drug is meant to repress the activity of the central nervous system reducing anxiety, but impairing memory and judgment at the same time. The purpose of this was to illustrate to the world that he was one of the best informalist artists in the world. Greco emphasized the importance of big gestures and overdramatized performances; in his mind, that was the only way to convey his ideas. This is why he decided to make the performance of his death a big one. Before committing suicide, Greco called his family to let them know this was happening and invited them to watch; his family declined the offer. While dying, Greco wrote down all of the feelings he was experiencing while on barbiturates. Before losing feeling in his body he wrote the word "Fin" on his left hand; fin meaning "end".

References 

1931 births
1965 deaths
Artists from Buenos Aires
1965 suicides
Drug-related suicides in Spain
Barbiturates-related deaths